My Paper Heart may refer to:

My Paper Heart (album), an album by Francesca Battistelli
"My Paper Heart" (song), a song by The All-American Rejects